María Magdalena Nile del Río (26 December 1906 – 22 August 2003) was an Argentine professional singer and movie actress, better known as Imperio Argentina; she became a citizen of Spain in 1999.

María Magdalena Nile del Río was born to Antonio Nile (a guitar player, born in Gibraltar) and Rosario del Río (a native of Monda in the Province of Málaga). She performed onstage in her native Argentina, where she had a long and successful career. At that time, her stage name was Pettit Imperio. But her most successful moments came after she moved to Spain. It was there that she changed her name to Imperio Argentina, as a way to honor her "other country". While in Spain, del Río participated in many movies, and she participated frequently in television and radio. She obtained Spanish citizenship in 1999.

Death
In January 2003, she suffered an angina attack and was admitted to the University Hospital of Malaga. She died in Benalmádena in the Province of Málaga (her mother was born and raised in the same province) in August 2003, aged 97. She had two children. Her son, Florián Antonio Martínez Nile, by her marriage to Florián Rey, predeceased her, having committed suicide at age 24 in 1959. Her younger child was her daughter, Alejandra Goyanes Nile, by another marriage. She was married twice. As a divorcee, she could not, in Francoist Spain, legally marry Joaquín Goyanes, the father of her daughter.

Selected filmography

 Sister San Sulpicio (1927)
 Restless Hearts (1928)
 Los claveles de la virgen (1929)
  El amor solfeando (1930)
 Lo mejor es reír (1931) 
Cinópolis (1931)
 Su noche de bodas (1931)
  La casa es seria (1932)
 When Do You Commit Suicide? (1932)
  Suburban Melody (1933)
  El novio de mamá (1934)
 Sister San Sulpicio (1934)
  Nobleza baturra  (1935)
 Morena Clara (1936)
 Carmen (la de Triana) (1938)
 Nights in Andalusia (1938)
 The Song of Aixa (1939)
 The Story of Tosca (1941)
 Goyescas (1942)
 Bambú (1945)
 The Songstress (1946)
 Song of Dolores (1947)
 La cigarra (1948)
 With the East Wind (1966)
  Andalucía, un siglo de fascinación (1997, TV miniseries)

References

External links
 

2003 deaths
Naturalised citizens of Spain
Age controversies
Argentine emigrants to Spain
Actresses from Buenos Aires
Singers from Buenos Aires
Argentine people of Gibraltarian descent
Spanish film actresses
Spanish silent film actresses
Spanish stage actresses
Argentine silent film actresses
Argentine film actresses
Honorary Goya Award winners
Tango singers
20th-century Spanish singers
1906 births
20th-century Spanish women singers